The President is a South Korean television series starring real-life married couple Choi Soo-jong and Ha Hee-ra as Korea's president and his first lady. This is their first acting collaboration. It aired on KBS2 from December 15, 2010 to February 24, 2011 on Wednesdays and Thursdays at 21:05 for 24 episodes.

Plot
The drama follows the presidential election process to shed light on the right way of politics, the qualifications of a future Korean president, and also the personal tribulations and ambitions of politicians hidden behind the power struggles. Three months before the presidential nominating convention, Jang Il-joon, from the New Wave Party, declared his candidacy. On that same day, a woman died in a gas explosion in Sam-Chuk. There is little doubt that the accident and the nomination of Jang Il-joon are related. Meanwhile, Yoo Min-ki, a documentary producer, heard of his mother's sudden death and headed for Sam-Chuk. As he cast his mother's ashes in the sea, he thought of his childhood: his father always blurt out that Min-ki was not his own son whenever he was drunk. Min-ki believed that his father was telling the truth because he had seen his mother tearing up and looking at an old photograph of a man often. Min-ki discovered that the photograph was gone when he was cleaning up his mother's belongings. After the funeral, Min-ki returned to Seoul and Jang Il-joon asked Min-ki to work as a PR agent to record the election campaign process. Min-ki asked Il-joon why he was chosen, and Il-joon confessed that Min-ki was his son. The man in the picture Min-ki had seen was Jang Il-joon. However, Min-ki felt something had gone wrong as he realized that the picture had disappeared. Now Min-ki suspects that his mother's death was not an accident and that Jang Il-joon had actually killed her.

Errors

Episode 9
At the election in Gangwon-Do the total number of votes cast is 1,530. 6 of these votes are spoiled, so the total number of valid votes is 1,524. However, according to the English subtitles, the votes cast for the four candidates add up to 1,531.

Casts

Main cast
 Choi Soo-jong as Jang Il-joon
 Ha Hee-ra as Jo So-hee
 Jay Kim as Yoo Min-ki
 Wang Ji-hye as Jang In-young
 Lee Sungmin as Jang Sung-min

Supporting cast
 Kang Shin-il as Lee Chi-soo
 Im Ji-eun as Oh Jae-hee
 Lee Doo-il as Hong Sung-goo
 Kim Heung-soo as Ki Soo-chan
 Park Mi-jin as Jang Se-bin
 Shin Choong-shik as Jo Tae-ho
 Choi Dong-joon as Jo Sang-jin
 Kim Ye-ryeong as Yoo Jung-hye
 Kang Shin-jo as Hwang Chul-woo
 Jung Han-yong as Lee Soo-myung
 Yang Hee-kyung as Choi Jung-im
 Byun Hee-bong as Go Sang-ryul
 Lee Ki-yeol as Park Eul-sub
 Kim Jung-nan as Shin Hee-joo
 Hong Yo-seob as Kim Kyung-mo
 Kim Kyu-chul as Baek Chan-ki

Guest cast
 Jung Dong-hwan as Han Dae-woon (cameo)

References

External links
  
 
 

Korean-language television shows
2010 South Korean television series debuts
2011 South Korean television series endings
Korean Broadcasting System television dramas
South Korean political television series